Zaliab or Zali Ab may refer to:
 Zaliab, Khorramabad, Lorestan Province
 Zaliab, Kuhdasht, Lorestan Province